Standards and Practices is the fourth studio album by the American punk rock band Face to Face. It was a cover album that released in 1999 under the label Lady Luck, Face to Face's imprint through Vagrant Records. It was re-released two years later on February 20, 2001, on Vagrant Records. It contains a mixture of rock, punk rock, and new wave cover tracks.

Track listing

Personnel
Face to Face – main performer, producer  
Trever Keith – vocals, guitar  
Chad Yaro – guitar, backing vocals
Scott Shiflett – bass guitar, backing vocals
Pete Parada – drums
Additional personnel
Chad Blinman – mixing and recording
Ramon Breton – mastering

References

Face to Face (punk band) albums
1999 albums
Covers albums
Vagrant Records albums